Worth Township may refer to:

Illinois
 Worth Township, Cook County, Illinois
 Worth Township, Woodford County, Illinois

Indiana
 Worth Township, Boone County, Indiana

Iowa
 Worth Township, Boone County, Iowa

Michigan
 Worth Township, Michigan

Pennsylvania
 Worth Township, Butler County, Pennsylvania
 Worth Township, Centre County, Pennsylvania
 Worth Township, Mercer County, Pennsylvania

See also
Worth (disambiguation)

Township name disambiguation pages